The SP-77 is a highway in the southeastern part of the state of São Paulo in Brazil.  The highway is known as Nilo Maximo for its entire length and begins within Jacareí, runs through Santa Branca and ends in Salesópolis.

References

Highways in São Paulo (state)